The 1962–63 European Cup was the fifth edition of Europe's premier club handball tournament.

Knockout stage

Round 1

|}

Round of 16

|}

Quarterfinals

	

|}

Semifinals

|}

Finals

|}

External links 
 EHF Champions League website
 1963 edition

EHF Champions League seasons
Champions League
Champions League